Paula Karen Roberson is a biostatistician at the University of Arkansas for Medical Sciences, where she chairs the department of biostatistics. Her research interests include the design of clinical trials, nonparametric statistics, and feature selection.
She was president of the Caucus for Women in Statistics in 2015.

Education and career
Roberson graduated from Southern Methodist University in 1974 with a bachelor's degree in mathematics and statistics. She completed her Ph.D. in biomathematics at the University of Washington in 1979.
Her dissertation, Distributional and Robustness Problems in Time-Space Disease Clustering, was supervised by Lloyd Fisher. She joined the University of Arkansas faculty in 1993, and became the founding chair of the biostatistics department there in 2004.

Recognition
Roberson became a Fellow of the American Statistical Association in 2000. In 2014, she was elected as a Fellow of the American Association for the Advancement of Science.

References

Year of birth missing (living people)
Living people
American statisticians
Women statisticians
Biostatisticians
Southern Methodist University alumni
University of Washington alumni
University of Arkansas for Medical Sciences faculty
Fellows of the American Statistical Association
Fellows of the American Association for the Advancement of Science